Bishop Sutton Association Football Club is a football club based in Bishop Sutton, Somerset, England.

History
The original Bishop Sutton football club was established in the 1900s, but folded during the war. The modern club was established in 1977 as an under-12 team and joined the Woodspring and District League. As the team aged, they progressed to under-16 football, before joining the Bristol & Avon League. In 1980–81 the club won the Somerset Junior Cup.

In 1983 Bishop Sutton moved up to the Somerset County League, joining Division One. They were Division One champions at the first attempt, earning promotion to the Premier Division. The club finished as runners-up in the Premier Division in 1989–90, and after finishing fourth the following season, they were accepted into Division One of the Western League. In 1997–98 the club won Division One and were promoted to the Premier Division. Despite finishing second-from-bottom of the league in 2006–07, they were not relegated, and went on win the Premier Division title in 2012–13. However, the club had not applied for promotion to the Southern League, and so remained in the Premier Division.

However, after Bishop Sutton won the league, manager Lee Lashenko resigned. The club subsequently finished in the bottom three of the Premier Division in 2013–14 and then finished bottom of the division the following season, resulting in relegation to Division One. They went on to finish bottom of Division One 2015–16, but were not relegated.

Ground
The modern club have played at Lakeview on Wick Road since their establishment. An outbuilding belonging to the nearby Butchers Arms pub was used as changing rooms until a new changing room block was built. The ground current has a capacity of 1,500, of which 100 is seated and 200 covered.

Honours
Western League
Premier Division champions 2012–13
Division One champions 1997–98
Somerset County League
Division One champions 1983–84
Somerset Junior Cup
Winners 1980–81

Records
Best FA Cup performance: Second qualifying round, 2003–04
Best FA Vase performance: Third round, 1995–96
Record attendance: 400 vs Bristol City

See also
Bishop Sutton A.F.C. players

References

External links
Official website

Football clubs in Somerset
Football clubs in England
Association football clubs established in 1977
1977 establishments in England
Bath and North East Somerset
Bristol and Avon Association Football League
Somerset County League
Western Football League